Integrate Health (formerly known as Hope Through Health) is an American Boston, Massachusetts-based non-profit health care organization founded in 2004 by then Peace Corps volunteers Kevin Fiori, Jr. and Jennifer Schechter in partnership with a community of people living with HIV/AIDS, Association Espoir pour Demain-Lidaw. Integrate Health, in partnership with AED-Lidaw, initially focused on providing care for people living with HIV/AIDS in Kara, Togo, West Africa where these services were not yet available. Since then its programs have expanded to include a prevention of mother-to-child transmission (PMTCT) program, which was launched in 2005 and replicated by the Togolese Ministry of Health in a regional public hospital in 2010. 

In August 2015, Integrate Health expanded its programs to provide more services to mothers and children. This Integrated Primary Care Program was designed to address major barriers that keep women from accessing healthcare, including distance to clinics, high user fees, lack of adequate training for clinical workers, and lack of supplies at clinics. Integrate Health currently serves a population of 166,418 people in northern Togo and operates through eighteen rural clinics.

Mission 
The mission of Integrate Health (IH) is to make quality primary healthcare accessible to all. IH works alongside governments and the local community to implement and study an integrated approach to strengthening primary healthcare delivery in order to achieve universal health coverage. By integrating professional  community health workers with improved care in public clinics, this approach creates a patient-centered health system that is accountable to the community and dramatically reduces mortality in severely resource-limited settings.

References

External links
 Integrate Health

Organizations based in Boston